The 2015 Marist Red Foxes football team represented Marist College in the 2015 NCAA Division I FCS football season. They were led by 24th-year head coach Jim Parady and played their home games at Tenney Stadium at Leonidoff Field. They were a member of the Pioneer Football League. They finished the season 5–6, 4–4 in PFL play to finish in a three way tie for fourth place.

Schedule

Source: Schedule

References

Marist
Marist Red Foxes football seasons
Marist Red Foxes football